The 1996–97 season was the 100th season of competitive football in Scotland. This season saw a playoff system introduced between the second bottom club in the Premier Division and the second-top club in Division One.

Scottish Premier Division

Champions: Rangers 
Relegated: Raith Rovers

Premier Division/Division One playoff
 Hibernian 1–0 Airdrieonians
 Airdrieonians 2–4 Hibernian
(Hibernian win 5–2 on aggregate)

Scottish League Division One

Promoted: St. Johnstone
Relegated: Clydebank, East Fife

Scottish League Division Two

Promoted: Ayr United, Hamilton Academical
Relegated: Dumbarton, Berwick Rangers

Scottish League Division Three

Promoted: Inverness CT, Forfar Athletic

Other honours

Cup honours

Individual honours

SPFA awards

SFWA awards

Scottish clubs in Europe

Average coefficient – 3.125

Scotland national team

Key:
 (H) = Home match
 (A) = Away match
 WCQG4 = World Cup qualifying – Group 4

Notable events
 Rangers matched Celtic's record of nine successive top division titles.
 Tommy Burns was sacked as Celtic manager after the end of the season, having won just one trophy in his three years in charge.
 Mark Hateley briefly returned to Rangers after a year in England to provide cover in attack during the title run-in, before moving back to England as player-manager of Hull City.
 Kilmarnock won the Scottish Cup to end their 32-year wait for a major trophy.
 Veteran goalkeeper Jim Leighton transferred from Hibernian to Aberdeen at the end of the season.
 Former Scotland striker Mo Johnston moved to America at the start of the season to play for Kansas City Wizards in the American Major League.
 Trevor Steven, the former England winger, retired from playing at the end of the season after winning seven league titles with Rangers since first joining them in 1989.
 St Johnstone returned to the Premier Division by winning the Division One title by a 20-point margin.
 Brian Laudrup was voted SFWA Footballer of the Year.
 Paolo di Canio was voted SPFA Players' Player of the Year after scoring 15 league goals for Celtic after joining them from AC Milan in his native Italy, but during the close season left them to join Sheffield Wednesday for £4.7million.

Notes and references

 
Seasons in Scottish football